DYAJ (90.3 FM), broadcasting as Power 90.3, is a radio station owned and operated by Word Broadcasting Corporation. Its studio and transmitter are located in Ormoc.

References

Radio stations in Leyte (province)
Radio stations established in 2005
Christian radio stations in the Philippines